Stop! Look! and Laugh! is a 1960 feature-length Three Stooges compilation featuring Moe Howard, Larry Fine, and Curly Howard. 
Eleven of the Stooges shorts were shown and bridged together with segments featuring Paul Winchell and his dummies, Jerry Mahoney and Knucklehead Smiff. Near the end of the film, the Marquis Chimps perform a version of Cinderella narrated in rhyme by Winchell, with June Foray providing female voices and Alan Reed providing male voices, as part of Jerry's bedtime story.
New York Stooges TV host Officer Joe Bolton (a staple of WPIX-TV through the early 1970s) has a cameo as a customer in a cafe.

Plot
Paul Winchell plays a father to Jerry Mahoney, who is avoiding going to school at all costs where he is failing his subjects.  Mahoney's tricks range from painting the window black to sleep in, continually falling asleep, and pretending to be sick by painting spots on his face and heating a thermometer with a match to give him a temperature reading of 264F to stay home. Winchell relates stories that segue into scenes from Three Stooges short subjects with the film concluding with a loud party that is footage from Half-Wits Holiday.  As Winchell enters the home to complain of the noise, he is hit with one of the pies in that sequence's pie fight.

Production
The film provoked controversy due to a lawsuit filed by the Three Stooges, who claimed producer Harry A. Romm, who had produced their previous film Have Rocket, Will Travel, created the film without their knowledge or permission.  Columbia Pictures, which would eventually distribute the film, apologized and admitted that it had made an error by putting together a compilation of Three Stooges shorts without the team's consent. Both parties agreed to have the film released on July 4, 1960, and to provide the funding for the Three Stooges' then-newly formed production company, Normandy Production.

Featured shorts
The following eleven Stooge shorts were featured in Stop! Look! and Laugh!:
 Oily to Bed, Oily to Rise (1939)
 How High Is Up?  (1940)
 Violent Is the Word for Curly (1938)
 Sock-a-Bye Baby  (1942)
 Higher Than a Kite (1943)
 What's the Matador? (1942)
 Calling All Curs (1939)
 Goofs and Saddles (1937)
 Micro-Phonies (1945)
 A Plumbing We Will Go (1940)
 Half-Wits Holiday (1947)

See also
 List of American films of 1960

References

External links 
 
 
 
 Stop! Look! and Laugh! at threestooges.net

1960 films
1960 comedy films
American slapstick comedy films
American black-and-white films
Columbia Pictures films
Compilation films
1960s English-language films
The Three Stooges films
Films based on Charles Perrault's Cinderella
1960s American films